Oxynoemacheilus leontinae is a species of stone loach found in the Jordan and Litani river systems in Israel, Lebanon, and Syria.
Its natural habitat is slow moving rivers.

References

leontinae
Taxa named by Louis Charles Émile Lortet
Fish described in 1883
Taxonomy articles created by Polbot